The Best Butter is a 1952 novel by the French writer Jean Dutourd. It was published in the United Kingdom as The Milky Way. It tells the story of a Paris dairy shop during the German occupation, and how the politically uninterested manager adapts to the situation and collaborates whenever he finds it favorable. The novel satirizes the French attitude toward the occupation.

It received the Prix Interallié. It became a bestseller in France and sold more than two million copies. A film adaptation for TF1 directed by Édouard Molinaro was released in 1981.

Publication
The book was published through éditions Gallimard on 10 September 1952. It was published in English in 1955, translated by Robin Chancellor. The American title is The Best Butter and the British title is The Milky Way.

References

External links
 The Best Butter at the French publisher's website 

1952 French novels
Novels set in Paris
French novels adapted into films
French-language novels
Novels set during World War II